Lethe  tristigmata,   the  spotted mystic, is a species of Satyrinae butterfly found in the  Indomalayan realm (Sikkim, Nepal) .

References

tristigmata
Butterflies of Asia